Cinchonidine is an alkaloid found in Cinchona officinalis and Gongronema latifolium. It is used in asymmetric synthesis in organic chemistry.

References 

Secondary alcohols
Vinyl compounds
Quinoline alkaloids
Quinuclidine alkaloids